Elmer is a town in Jackson County, Oklahoma, United States.  The population was 96 at the 2010 census.

Geography
Elmer is located at  (34.479963, -99.352749).

Climate

Demographics

As of the census of 2010, there were 96 people living in the town.  The population density was 240 people per square mile (87/km2).  There were 58 housing units at an average density of 145 per square mile (53/km2).  The racial makeup of the town was 87.50% White, 2.08% African American, 2.08% Native American, 1.04% Pacific Islander, 6.25% from other races, and 1.04% from two or more races. Hispanic or Latino of any race were 12.50% of the population.

There were 41 households, out of which 22.0% had children under the age of 18 living with them, 56.1% were married couples living together, 12.2% had a female householder with no husband present, and 31.7% were non-families. 29.3% of all households were made up of individuals, and 12.2% had someone living alone who was 65 years of age or older. The average household size was 2.34 and the average family size was 2.79.

In the town, the population was spread out, with 21.9% under the age of 18, 6.3% from 18 to 24, 30.2% from 25 to 44, 27.1% from 45 to 64, and 14.6% who were 65 years of age or older. The median age was 37 years. For every 100 females, there were 104.3 males. For every 100 females age 18 and over, there were 97.4 males.

The median income for a household in the town was $35,208, and the median income for a family was $35,208. Males had a median income of $18,750 versus $14,167 for females. The per capita income for the town was $15,165. There were 10.3% of families and 9.3% of the population living below the poverty line, including no under eighteens and 17.6% of those over 64.

References

External links
 Encyclopedia of Oklahoma History and Culture - Elmer

Towns in Jackson County, Oklahoma
Towns in Oklahoma